Agnieszka Radwańska was the defending champion but chose not to compete.
Dominika Cibulková defeated her close friend Marion Bartoli 6–1, 7–5 in the final to win the tournament.

Seeds
The top four seeds receive a bye into the second round.

Draw

Finals

Top half

Bottom half

Qualifying

Seeds

Qualifiers

Lucky loser
  Melanie Oudin

Draw

First qualifier

Second qualifier

Third qualifier

Fourth qualifier

External links
 Main draw
 Qualifying draw

2012 WTA Tour
2012 Singles